Starksia sangreyae, the Sangrey's blenny, is a species of labrisomid blenny native to the Caribbean coasts of Belize and probably also Honduras where it is found in shallow waters at depths of from . It was originally known as Starksia atlantica, and is also closely related to Starksia springeri. The species is named after Mary Sangrey, a scientist from Smithsonian Institution. This species can reach a length of  SL.

References

sangreyae
Fish described in 2011